Played may refer to:
 Played (album), a 1987 album
 Played (film), a 2006 film
 Played (TV series), a 2013 TV series

See also 
 Plaid (disambiguation)
 Play (disambiguation)
 Player (disambiguation)